This is a list of Brigade of Guards recipients of the Victoria Cross. The Victoria Cross (VC) is a military decoration that may be bestowed upon members of the British or Commonwealth armed forces for acts of valour or gallantry performed in the face of the enemy. Within the British honours system and those of many Commonwealth nations it is the highest award a soldier can receive for actions in combat. It was established in 1856 and since then has been awarded 1,356 times, including three service personnel who were awarded the VC twice.

The VC was introduced on 29 January 1856 by Queen Victoria to reward acts of valour during the Crimean War. The traditional explanation of the source of the gunmetal from which the medals are struck is that it derives from Russian cannon captured at the siege of Sevastopol. Recent research has thrown doubt on this story, suggesting a variety of origins. The original Royal Warrant did not contain a specific clause regarding posthumous awards, although official policy was to not award the VC posthumously. Between 1897 and 1901, several notices were issued in the London Gazette regarding soldiers who would have been awarded the VC had they survived. In a partial reversal of policy in 1902, six of the soldiers mentioned were granted the VC, but not "officially" awarded the medal. In 1907, the posthumous policy was completely reversed and medals were sent to the next of kin of the six officers and men. The Victoria Cross warrant was not officially amended to explicitly allow posthumous awards until 1920 but one quarter of all awards for the First World War were posthumous.

Due to its rarity, the VC is highly prized and the medal has fetched over £400,000 at auction. A number of public and private collections are devoted to the Victoria Cross. The private collection of Lord Ashcroft, amassed since 1986, contains over one-tenth of all VCs awarded. Following a 2008 donation to the Imperial War Museum, the Ashcroft collection went on public display alongside the museum's Victoria and George Cross collection in November 2010. Since 1990, three Commonwealth countries that retain the Queen as head of state have instituted their own versions of the VC. As a result, the original Victoria Cross is sometimes referred to as the "Commonwealth Victoria Cross" or the "Imperial Victoria Cross", to distinguish it from the newer awards.

The peacetime role of the Brigade of Guards is mostly ceremonial, wearing their distinctive red uniforms, guarding the British Royal Family and their residences. However like the rest of the British Army, during wartime they take their place in the front line. Sometimes as individual battalions attached to other formations, or as during the First World War and the Second World War forming complete divisions. Since the Victoria Cross was introduced there have been forty-four awards to members of the Brigade of Guards. The first during the Crimean War, when it was awarded twelve times to members of the then three guards regiments. By the First World War, the number of guards regiments had increased to five and the number of recipients during the conflict was twenty-four, and a further eight men became recipients during the Second World War. The last award of a VC to a member of the Brigade of Guards was in June 2012 to James Ashworth of the Grenadier Guards.

Guards recipients

References
Footnotes

Citations

Bibliography

 

 
Guards Division (United Kingdom)
Guards